"They Can’t Take That Away" is a single by New Zealand Idol season one winner, Benjamin Lummis, released in 2004. It went to number one in its first week, where it remained for seven weeks.

"They Can't Take That Away" was 2004's number one single in the Top 50 singles of the year in New Zealand chart.

Song information

Track listings

They Can't Take That Away
Coffee & Cream

New Zealand Idol
2004 singles
Number-one singles in New Zealand
2004 songs
Songs written by Steve Kipner
Songs written by Andrew Frampton (songwriter)